Catharina Elisabeth Velten née Paulsen (1646–1712) was a German stage actress and theatre manager.  She was the manager of the famous Hochdeutsche Hofcomödianten in 1692–1712.

She was the daughter of the actor-manager Carl Andreas Paulsen (1620–1679) and Catharina Lydia (d. 1675) and married in 1671 to the actor-manager Johannes Velten (1640–1692), who took over her father's theatre company in 1678. She acted in her father's and then her husband's company and took over it herself after the death of her spouse. Her company was famous in Germany and the Nordic countries.

She is described as an educated woman, and are known to have participated in a debate with the theatre-hostile deacon Johann Joseph Winckler of Magdeburg, when she refused his Biblical arguments in Latin and Greek.

References

 http://saebi.isgv.de/biografie/Catharina_Velten_(gest._nach_1712) 
 Katy Schlegel, Velten (Velthen, Velthemin, Veltheim), Catharina Elisabeth, in: Sächsische Biografie, hrsg. vom Institut für Sächsische Geschichte und Volkskunde e.V., bearb. von Martina Schattkowsky, Online-Ausgabe: https://web.archive.org/web/20150721202407/http://www.isgv.de/saebi (31.1.2015)

1646 births
1712 deaths
17th-century German actresses
German theatre directors
17th-century theatre managers
18th-century theatre managers
18th-century German actresses
Women theatre managers and producers
Women theatre directors
18th-century German businesswomen
18th-century German businesspeople
17th-century German businesswomen
17th-century German businesspeople